Pedro de Alcántara Álvarez de Toledo y Palafox, 12th Marquess of Molina, 13th Marquess of Villafranca (11 May 1803 – 10 January 1867) was Spanish Minister of Naval affairs, mid-19th century, reign of Isabella II of Spain counting amongst other political achievements the construction and  launch in the Royal Dockyards of Ferrol, of Spain's first steam propelled ship in 1858. The ship was named after the Spanish monarch (i.e.: Isabel II). Medina Sidonia was succeeded by his son José Joaquín Álvarez de Toledo, 18th Duke of Medina Sidonia.

|-

117
110
19th-century Spanish nobility
1803 births
1867 deaths